Chinguacousy Secondary School  founded in 1972, is a high school located in Brampton, Ontario, Canada.  Since 2000, the school's enrollment has expanded  with the development of the surrounding area. 
The school sports teams and athletic programs have won a number of OFSAA championships; wrestling (1991, 1992, 1993, 1995), curling (1996, 1998), and rugby (1982).  Chinguacousy became competitive in basketball and has won several titles since 2000. In 2011, the Junior Boys Cross Country team won the ROPSSAA Championship for the first time since 1997. Chinguacousy currently has a SciTech Program running. From 1972 - 2016, the mascot was Chinguacousy Chiefs. In June 2016, the school changed its logo and school mascot to the Chinguacousy Timberwolves after a call to indigenous and aboriginal inclusiveness from the Peel District School Board.

Academics

Standardized test results 
Scores are displayed for the EQAO (academic) and OSSLT based on data from the Education Quality and Accountability Office. The percentage for the EQAO represents the percentage of all Grade 9 students at or above the provincial standard. The  OSSLT results represent the percentage of fully participated students who were successful. Due to exceptional circumstances, 2015 assessment data for the EQAO are unavailable. Combined achievement results are based on available years’ data.

Science and tech program 
The school opened a science and technology program that focuses on the application of science, technology, engineering and mathematics. According to the SciTech Academic Development Committee (SADC) "SciTech is an innovative program for high school students that integrates STEAM learning into the standard curriculum. Students learn how to apply scientific and technological skills through a HANDS-ON,MINDS-ON APPROACH". Students learn industry grade engineering CAD design software such as Autodesk Inventor and apply it to create a variety of projects. Students then have access to a variety of machines to facilitate the creation of their projects such as 3D printers, CNC routers, milling machines, a lathe, and several other common manufacturing machines.  More information about applications to the program can be found on the official website.

Robotics 
Chinguacousy Robotics, is a decade old robotics club at Chinguacousy Secondary School . They participate in the FIRST Robotics Competition (FRC) and VEX Robotics. Currently (2021) the team has over 100 participants and competes in FRC. The team has many accomplishments, most notably, winning the VEX Robotics World Championship in 2014.

Sports success 
In 2011, the Junior Boys Cross Country team won the ROPSSAA Championship for the first time since 1997. Additionally, they traveled to Ottawa to participate in the provincial championships called OFSAA and ranking in the Top 10 of the best teams for that year in Ontario.

In 2018, the Boys Ball Hockey Team won the Tier 2 Peel Ball Hockey Championship. They defeated Louise Arbour Secondary School with a final score of 4–0, in the championship game.

Notable alumni
Karl Ludwig, former Paralympic athlete, 2014 Olympic bronze medallist
Raj Grewal, politician
Zarqa Nawaz, writer and filmmaker
Russell Peters, stand-up comedian (grades 9–10)
Alyssa Reid, singer
Alisha Tatham, Olympic athlete and professional basketball player
Tamara Tatham, Member of Canadian Women's basketball team, Olympic athlete
Darryl Hinds, Canadian actor and sketch comedian
Dhruv Thakor, Professional Stunt Actor

References

External links
 Chinguacousy Secondary School website

Peel District School Board
High schools in Brampton
Educational institutions established in 1972
1972 establishments in Ontario